Väster, also called West, is a city district in Malmö Municipality, Sweden. It was established on 1 July 2013 after the merger of Hyllie and Limhamn-Bunkeflo. It has a population of 75,600.

References

City districts of Malmö